The West Karbi Anglong district is a district formed out of the existing Donka circle of Karbi Anglong district of Assam in 2016. Hamren is the headquarter of the newly formed district. The district is part of Karbi Anglong Autonomous Council and administered according to the provisions of Sixth Scheduled of the Indian Constitution.

History
The hill tribes of Northeast India were independent of the settled empires around them prior to the British colonisation of the region. After the recommendation of Simon Commission, the hills area (Now present district, Karbi Anglong district, Dima Hasao district) was given a different status under Section 92 of the Government of India Act 1935: Mikir Hills was placed under the "Partially Excluded Areas". The Govt. of Assam, which means had no jurisdiction over the excluded areas which were administered directly under the special power of the Governor.

During mid-1930: Political leaders Semsonsing Ingti, Seng Bey, Khorsing Terang, etc. emerged from this particular area. In 1937, these leaders, in a memorandum to Assam Governor, Sir Robert Neil Reid, at Mohungodijua, demanded a separate hill district for Mikirs. A regional political forum, called Karbi-A-Durbar, was formed to intensify the movement.

After Independence of India, the hill district was formed by the name of United Mikir & NC Hills on 17 November 1951 under Sixth Schedule of the Indian Constitution. Since then, the district has been constant part of Autonomous State demand movement. The District was later divided into Karbi Anglong and North Cachar Hills district on 2 February 1970.

In 2016, Karbi Anglong district was further divided into two, of which the west part (comprising Donka revenue circle), including Hamren, Baithalangso (Vothatlangso) and Dongkamukam and other adjoining areas formed the new district of West Karbi Anglong to develop the mass rural area. Hamren is the headquarters of the newly created district.

Geography
Karbi Anglong plateau is an extension of the Indian Plate (The Peninsular Block) in the Assam of India. This area receives maximum rainfall from the Southwest summer Monsoon from June through September. It is bounded by Golaghat in east, Meghalaya and Morigaon on west, Nagaon on North NC hills and Nagaland in the south. The district covers an area of 3035 sq.km.

The eastern part of this region is plain and the western part is mostly covered with hills. The important rivers of this district are: The Myntriang River, Karbi Langpi River, Kopili river and Amreng river. Among these rivers, Hydro Electric Project have been set up on the Myntriang and Karbi Langpi rivers.

Administration
The district is administrated under Karbi Anglong Autonomous Council. CEM is the Chief executive of the district, supported by 14 Executive Member of the Council. The Principal Secretary (generally an officer selected from IAS/ACS cadre) of Karbi Anglong Autonomous Council is the administrative head of the district. The Deputy Commissioner is responsible for the maintenance of law & order, and administration of justice.

Hamren is the district headquarter. The district has one sub-division, namely Hamren sub-division, and one Revenue circle, Dongkamukam.

Police station 
West Karbi Anglong district have three police station namely Hamren PS, Baithalangso PS, Kheroni PS and Zerikingding PS.

Demographics
According to the 2011 census, West Karbi Anglong district, then comprising the Donka revenue circle of the Karbi Anglong district, had a population of 295,358. Indigenous communities such as Hills Tiwa, Karbis, Garos, Bodos form majority of the population, comprising 193,518 (65.52%) of the population. Scheduled Castes are 11,438 (3.87%) of the population. Other communities that migrated to West Karbi Anglong district include Bengalis, Biharis and Nepalis during the British rule.

Religion 

Hinduism is the largest community making up 2,34,833 (79.51%) of the population, while Christians are 56,538 (19.14%). Much of the population practices traditional tribal religion but records their religion as Hindu on the census.

Language

As of the 2011 census, 49.68% of the population spoke Karbi, 10.37% Bhojpuri , 6.98% Nepali, 5.89% Bengali, 5.73% Garo, 5.43% Tiwa, 4.69% Assamese, 3.27% Khasi, 3.18% Hindi, 1.45% Dimasa and 1.28% Boro as their first language.

Transport 
The district headquarter Hamren is well connected by road. Karbi Anglong Autonomous Council Transport buses ply at regular intervals from the district headquarters to important places like Guwahati, Nagaon, Diphu, Lanka, Hojai and Jowai.

Notable town and place of interest
 Hamren
 Baithalangso
 Dongkamukam
 Shikdamakha

Notable people 
 Semsonsing Ingti

See also
 Karbi Anglong district

References

External links

 
2016 establishments in Assam
Autonomous regions of India
Districts of Assam
States and territories established in 2016